Brenda Brenon is a former sportscaster.

Early life
Brenon grew up in the suburbs outside of Buffalo, New York. She was the youngest of ten children. She graduated from high school in three years and from Buffalo State College in three as well.

Career

Buffalo
In 1985, she was hired by WKBW-TV sports director Rick Azar as a part-time sports producer. She later moved into an on-camera role, reporting on the Buffalo Sabres. During her tenure at Channel 7, Brenon was credited with breaking the story about Clint Malarchuk's obsessive–compulsive disorder.

National work
In 1994, Brenon worked as an interviewer for NBC's coverage of the NHL All-Star Game. She also worked as an interviewer for the NHL on ABC and ESPN National Hockey Night.

Boston
Brenon married The Boston Globe hockey writer Kevin Dupont in August 1994. She resigned from Channel 7 shortly thereafter to move to Boston with her husband.

In 1995, Brenon began writing for The Boston Globe. She was also hired to serve as one of six rotating anchors for NewSport's Scoreboard Central.

In September 1995, she was hired by NESN to host the network's Boston Bruins telecasts. She would also do feature pieces for its Front Row program. On July 31, 1997, Brenon was fired by NESN. However, she returned to her job in September after the United States Department of Labor ordered the network to rehire her with back pay under the Family and Medical Leave Act of 1993, which provides job protection during maternity. Brenon did not return for the 1998–99 Bruins season, as her position of between-periods reporter was eliminated.

References

American television sports anchors
Buffalo Sabres announcers
Boston Bruins announcers
National Hockey League broadcasters
Buffalo State College alumni
Living people
American women television journalists
20th-century American journalists
Year of birth missing (living people)
20th-century American women
21st-century American women